Love Affair, or the Case of the Missing Switchboard Operator is a 1967 Yugoslav film directed by Dušan Makavejev.

Plot
The film begins with a sexologist in his office, talking about the history of sex.

Izabela (Eva Ras), an ethnic Hungarian switchboard operator, meets and falls in love with a Sandžak Muslim sanitation inspector named Ahmed (Slobodan Aligrudić), who soon moves into her apartment and has a bathtub installed. The film then cuts away to a police investigation of the death of a young woman by drowning. Ahmed goes away on business for a month. During his absence, Izabela finally gives in to a persistently amorous postman.

When Ahmed returns, he finds Izabela different, less loving. (She has found out she is pregnant.) He gets very drunk, and when Isabella chases after him to keep him from harm, he threatens to commit suicide by jumping into an underground vat of water. However, Ahmed ends up accidentally pushing Izabela in instead, killing her. He goes into hiding, but is arrested by the police for murder. The film concludes with a scene of Ahmed and Izabela walking down a staircase.

Cast 
 Eva Ras - Izabela
 Slobodan Aligrudić - Ahmed
 Ružica Sokić - Ruža
 Miodrag Andrić - Mića

Home media
It was released as part of the three-film DVD collector's set Eclipse Series 18: Dušan Makavejev—Free Radical by the Criterion Collection.

References

External links

1967 films
Yugoslav avant-garde and experimental films
Films directed by Dušan Makavejev
Political satire films
1967 romantic drama films
Serbo-Croatian-language films
Serbian romantic drama films
1960s avant-garde and experimental films
Yugoslav romantic drama films
Switchboard operators
Films set in Yugoslavia